Get Squiggling is a British children's television series created and produced by Jo Killingley at Dot To Dot Productions, directed by Adrian Hedley, and broadcast on CBeebies and BBC Two in the UK.

Format
The programme begins with a theme song. The lead character is Squiglet, a monster who speaks directly to the audience. The programme itself teaches pre-school aged children how to draw, as well as basic colors and shapes. The audience is encouraged to use drawing as a method of triggering imagination, and as a means to progress the story. Each episode begins with him against a plain white background, which is gradually filled by the characters that he draws, like animals, objects, and landscapes, using his squiggle sticks and Squiggle Pad. There are seven different lines (loopy, round, straight, curved, bumpy, wavy and zig-zag) that Squiglet uses to draw with. The main character is then animated by Squiglet saying the magic words, "1, 2, 3, 4, 5, Let's make our squiggles come alive!" and they join the story. All other content in the show is animated based on his drawings. If the main character encounters a problem, Squiglet draws an object to help them solve the problem. If a problem cannot be solved, the Squiggle Pad gives them a clue to the problem with a short, live-action video. While most episodes end with a song related to the episode, summing up the preceding story, some episodes starting with "Spaceman" end with an epilogue that what happened to the episode, summing up the same preceding story as before. Each episode ends with Squiglet saying "Thanks for all your squiggles, it's time to go now, but come back to get squiggling soon. Keep on squiggling." and everybody says "Bye." before the end credits start to roll over.

Cast

John Hasler as all male characters

Teresa Gallagher as all female characters

Samantha Dodd and Janet James as Squiglet

Episodes

Series 1 (2008)

Series 2 (2010)

Get Squiggling Letters
On February 7, 2013, CBeebies commissioned a 26-episode spin-off to the series that focused on the letters of the alphabet. As with the original, Beyond Distribution handled worldwide distribution to the spin-off.

Get Squiggling Numbers
On January 1, 2023, CBeebies commissioned a 10-episode spin-off to the series that focused on the Numbers. As with the original, Beyond Distribution handled worldwide distribution to the spin-off.

Home Media releases
BBC Worldwide (2 Entertain) originally intended to release DVDs of the series in the United Kingdom, as hinted through a promo video featuring footage from the show, but the distributor never did any.

Abbey Home Media released a DVD in February 2011 called "Animal Magic", which includes many animal-related episodes,, with seven from the second series and two from the first series.

References

British preschool education television series
British television series with live action and animation
British television shows featuring puppetry
CBeebies
Television shows based on fairy tales
Works based on nursery rhymes
2008 British television series debuts
2010 British television series endings
2000s British children's television series
2010s British children's television series
2000s preschool education television series
2010s preschool education television series
English-language television shows